The 2018–19 Liga Panameña de Fútbol (also known as the Liga Cable Onda) was the 28th season of the Liga Panameña de Fútbol, the top-flight football league in Panama. The season began on 17 July 2017 and was scheduled to end in May 2018. Ten teams competed throughout the entire season.

Teams
Chorrillo formed with Deportivo Centenario de Coclé and la Universidad Latina de Panamá to become Unión Deportivo Universitario therefore there was no need for a relegation.  Taking their place for this season are the overall champions of last season's Liga Nacional de Ascenso, Costa del Este F.C.

Managerial changes

Before the start of the season

During the Apertura season

Between Apertura and Clausura seasons

During the Clausura season

Apertura

Personnel and sponsoring (2018 Apertura)

Standings

Results

Playoffs

Quarterfinals

Semifinals

First leg

Second leg

Tauro won 3-1 on aggregate.

Costa del Este won 4-3 on aggregate.

Final

Clausura

Personnel and sponsoring (2019 Clausura)

Standings

Results

Playoffs

Quarterfinals

Semifinals

First leg

Second leg

Final

Aggregate table

List of foreign players in the league
This is a list of foreign players for the 2018-2019. The following players:
have played at least one game for the respective club.
have not been capped for the Panama national football team on any level, independently from the birthplace 

 (player released mid season)
 (player released during Apertura and Clausura)

External links
 https://web.archive.org/web/20181006121704/http://panamafutbol.com/?cat=3&paged=3
 http://lpf.com.pa/w/category/noticas/
 https://int.soccerway.com/national/panama/lpf/20172018/apertura/r42284/
 http://www.rpctv.com/deportes/futbolnacional/

Liga Panameña de Fútbol seasons
Panama
1